Mark Medal (born June 10, 1957 in Manhattan, NY), was a professional boxer in the Light Middleweight (154lb) division. 
Medal, a Puerto Rican-American,  turned pro in 1979 and won the vacant IBF Light Middleweight Title with a fifth round TKO win over Earl Hargrove in 1984, becoming the inaugural champion. He lost the belt in his first defense to Carlos Santos. In 1986 he took on WBC Light Middleweight title holder Thomas Hearns, but lost via TKO. After his retirement from boxing at the age of 30 he became a member of the Jersey City Police Department.

See also

List of Puerto Ricans
 List of IBF world champions
 List of Puerto Rican boxing world champions

References

External links
 

1957 births
Boxers from New York (state)
Living people
People from Manhattan
World boxing champions
Puerto Rican male boxers
American male boxers
Light-middleweight boxers